Inekaren is a revolutionary organization founded on the 22 December 2008 in the Canary Islands.

Inekaren has two main objectives: 
a national revolution for the independence of the Canary Islands from Spain, and a social revolution.
The group defines itself as a pro-independence, socialist, anti-capitalist, anti-fascist, ecologist, nationalist and pro-Amazigh organization.

Inekaren seeks equal education for all, and has promoted activities towards this goal at the University of La Laguna as well as in other locations

Inekaren joined the World Amazigh Congress on January 27, 2013.

Political program
Inekaren has defined its political program by means of the following points:
Freedom for the Canarian people.
Sustainable development.
Full employment.
Free education, not manipulated by colonialism, capitalism and a non-commercialized education.
Free public healthcare.
Make all basic economic sectors e.g. water, energy, healthcare and education publicly owned, avoiding the speculation and privatization that make social welfare a business.
Defend the interests and rights of the working class.
To defeat the colonial and bourgeois elite that has supported the social status quo of the last five centuries.
To defend Canarian culture and to recover the memory and knowledge of Canarians and halt the spread of neocapitalist globalization and Spanish colonialism.
Dignity for all people.
A participative system, a just and equal society.

See also
Canarian nationalism
List of active separatist movements in Africa
List of active separatist movements in Europe

References

Canarian nationalist parties
Feminist parties in Europe
Political parties in the Canary Islands
Socialist parties in Spain
Left-wing nationalist parties
Feminist organisations in Spain